Plans is the fifth studio album by indie rock band Death Cab for Cutie, released August 30, 2005 on Atlantic Records.

The album spawned three singles: "Soul Meets Body", "Crooked Teeth", and "I Will Follow You into the Dark", with all three songs charting. "Soul Meets Body" and "Crooked Teeth" reached number five and number ten, respectively, on the US Alternative Songs chart. Although "I Will Follow You into the Dark" performed poorly in the charts compared to the previous singles, it eventually became Death Cab for Cutie's best-selling single to-date, and gained the band a nomination for a Grammy Award for Best Pop Performance by a Duo or Group with Vocals the following year.

Plans peaked at number four on the Billboard 200, and received platinum certification by the Recording Industry Association of America on February 28, 2008. The album was nominated for a Grammy Award for Best Alternative Music Album at the 48th Grammy Awards, held February 8, 2006.

Production
The album was recorded across the period of a month at a rural farmhouse studio located in North Brookfield, Massachusetts. The location was described by lead singer Ben Gibbard, as being "virtually in the middle of nowhere", the sort of place "a label sends a band if the singer's a junkie and they need to get him away from the bad things in the city", adding the location having the advantage that the band were able to "spread out while recording", which Gibbard stated was "really nice".

Plans was the first full-length album by the band not largely recorded in their native Pacific Northwest.

Album theme
Drummer Jason McGerr noted the continuity between Plans and the Death Cab for Cutie's previous album, Transatlanticism. McGerr stated "if Transatlanticism was an inhale, Plans is the exhale."

In explaining the theme of the album, Ben Gibbard stated "I don't think there's necessarily a story, but there's definitely a theme here. One of my favorite kind of dark jokes is, 'How do you make God laugh? You make a plan.' Nobody ever makes a plan that they're gonna go out and get hit by a car. A plan almost always has a happy ending. Essentially, every plan is a tiny prayer to Father Time. I really like the idea of a plan not being seen as having definite outcomes, but more like little wishes."

Reception

Plans received generally positive reviews from music critics. At Metacritic, which assigns a normalized rating out of 100 to reviews from mainstream critics, the album received an average score of 66, indicating "generally favorable reviews." Jonah Bayer of Alternative Press stated that Plans "seamlessly picks up right where 2003’s Transatlanticism left off" and praised its "cinematic" scope. The A.V. Clubs Josh Modell wrote that the band "wears grandiosity with grace, miniaturizing and polishing big, broad moments into tiny triumphs that, like audible illusions, feel simultaneously intimate and huge." David Turnbull of musicOMH deemed Plans to be "an album of progression that is likely to win the band plenty of new fans, but it shouldn't alienate their fanbase either." Rhyannon Rodriguez, writing for Kludge, regarded the album as "a melodically-mellow masterpiece" which expresses the "absolute epitome of this generation's pop." While stating that "at times, the writing feels almost too weightless", Ann Powers, writing in Blender, nonetheless contended that "repeat listening makes these songs reliably addictive."

In a mixed assessment, Betty Clarke of The Guardian felt that Plans was at times "unconvincing", but that when Gibbard "wrestles with big questions in smaller ways, he makes magic." While contending that Plans "doesn't differ radically from the previous four" Death Cab for Cutie albums, Q felt that Transatlanticism was a "more cohesive" effort. The NME wrote that the album was "produced within an inch of its shiny, whitebread life and the Cutie seem to have lost their faux-naive subtleties, becoming the non-thinking man's Coldplay along the way", while Uncut opined that the band's "failure to shift pace from a relentlessly wistful chug makes for an oddly exhausting listening experience." Nick Sylvester of The Village Voice wrote that "Death Cab succeed by refusing to offend", which "can be an admirable trait in a person, but never in a musician." In his Consumer Guide column for the same publication, Robert Christgau selected "I Will Follow You into the Dark" as a "choice cut", indicating a "good song on an album that isn't worth your time or money."

Reviewing the album for AllMusic, Rob Theakston declared that, "Plans is both a destination and a transitional journey for the group, one that sees the fulfillment of years of toiling away to develop their ideas and sound. But it's with the completion of those ideas that band is faced with a new set of crossroads and challenges to tread upon: to stay the course and suffer stagnation or try something bold and daringly new with their future."

Track listing

Notes
"Stable Song", the final track on the album, is a reworking of the song "Stability", originally a 12-minute-long track from The Stability EP which features songs from the limited edition and Japanese versions of 2001's The Photo Album.

"Different Names for the Same Thing" was written after a chance encounter on a train traveling rural Maryland.  Ben Gibbard overheard a conversation between a red haired woman he only knew as Ashley Renee and a man.  She expressed her frustration of people in her life not understanding her passions, emotions and love for life.  "The boundaries of language" was a phrase used to explain that while people may speak the same literal language the meaning is not always understood.

Personnel

Death Cab for Cutie
Ben Gibbard – vocals, guitars, piano
Nick Harmer – bass
Jason McGerr – drums
Chris Walla – guitars, keyboards, production

Production
Produced, recorded and mixed by Christopher Walla
Additional recording by Mike Lapierre, Kip Beelman, Robbie Skrocki, Beau Sorenson
'Crooked Teeth' mixed by Chris Shaw at Sound Track, New York, NY
William Swan – Trumpet (Track 2)
Sean Nelson – Harmonies (Track 8)
Recorded in the barn at Longview Farm, North Brookfields, MA
Additional recordings at Avast!, Seattle; Robert Lang Studios, Seattle; The Hall of Justice and Skrocki, Seattle
Mixed at Smart Studios in Madison, WI
Mastered by Roger Seibel at SAE Mastering in Phoenix, AZ
Artwork and layout – Adde Russell

Charts

Weekly charts

Year-end charts

Certifications

References

External links
 

2005 albums
Atlantic Records albums
Death Cab for Cutie albums
Albums produced by Chris Walla
Albums recorded at Long View Farm